Cryptanthus beuckeri is a plant species in the genus Cryptanthus. This species is endemic to Brazil.

Cultivars
 Cryptanthus 'Autumn Glow'
 Cryptanthus 'Betty Garrison'
 Cryptanthus 'Calypso'
 Cryptanthus 'Fred Ross'
 Cryptanthus 'Kashmir'
 Cryptanthus 'Little Bunniss'
 Cryptanthus 'Marble'
 Cryptanthus 'Marbled Spoon'
 Cryptanthus 'Mini Mocha Mint'
 Cryptanthus 'Mirabilis'
 Cryptanthus 'Monty' x beuckeri
 Cryptanthus 'Night Fall'
 Cryptanthus 'Osyanus'
 Cryptanthus 'Robert Read'
 Cryptanthus 'Soft Bronze'
 Cryptanthus 'Wild Marble'
 × Cryptbergia 'Hombre'
 × Cryptbergia 'Mead'
 × Cryptbergia 'Pinkie'
 × Cryptmea 'Dazzler'
 × Neotanthus 'Cafe Au Lait'
 × Neotanthus 'Sterling'

References

BSI Cultivar Registry Retrieved 11 October 2009

beuckeri
Flora of Brazil